What's It Like Over There? is the third studio album by British indie rock band, Circa Waves. The album was released 5 April 2019 through PIAS Recordings and Prolifica.

Critical reception
{{Album ratings
| aggregate1      = AOTY
| aggregate1score = 65/100
| MC        = 59/100
| rev1      = AllMusic
| rev1Score = <ref name="allmusic review">{{AllMusic | class= album | id= mw0003233822 | title= Review of 'What's It Like Over There | first= Matt | last= Collar | accessdate= 2 June 2019}}</ref>
| rev2      = DIY
| rev2Score = 
| rev3      = Dork| rev3Score = 
| rev4      = The Independent| rev4Score = 
| rev5      = NME| rev5Score = 
| rev6      = Q| rev6Score = 
| rev7      = The Skinny| rev7Score = 
}}What's It Like Over There? has received mixed reviews from contemporary music critics. At review aggregator website, Album of the Year, the album holds an average critic score of 65/100 indicating mixed reviews. On Metacritic, What's It Like Over There? holds an average critic score of 59 out of 100 indicating "mixed or average reviews based on 6 critics".

Dylan Tuck, writing for The Skinny praised Circa Waves' change in trajectory compared to their first two albums: Different Creatures and Young Chasers and compared the album to the Arctic Monkeys' Tranquility Base Hotel & Casino. Describing the piano-influences in the album, Tuck said "What's It Like Over There? sees the group ditch the surging guitars in favour of more subtle, delicate touches. In a very Arctic Monkey's move, throbbing, angst-fuelled rhythms make way for piano melodies (Times Won't Change Me, Passport), ambitiously pop-infused moments incorporated with an anthemic quality (Sorry I'm Yours, Be Somebody Good), or melancholic yet upbeat ballads (The Way We Say Goodbye)." Tuck ultimately awarded the album four stars out of five.

Dork magazine staff writer, Jamie MacMillan called What's It Like Over There? a "gospel-tinged bluesy piano number". MacMillan further said that "the band have created something that few would have seen coming, a seismic shift away from their usual big guitar sound into something far poppier and unrestrained by tired old tropes." Like Tuck, MacMillan also awarded the album four stars out of five.

Hannah Mylrea, writing for New Musical Express was more critical of What's It Like Over There?'' Mylrea felt that the album was inconsistent, with only a handful of well composed tracks, with "lacklustre" filler tracks. Mylrea summarized the album by saying "Circa Waves are no longer are the perfect band to accompany you and your pals necking tinnies in the sun, and instead sound more like the soundtrack to a Nicholas Sparks film. ‘What's It Like Over There?’ is the band's sugar rush sound moving into a toothache." Louisa Dixon, writing for DIY, was similarly critical of the album, describing it as "both over-produced and underwhelming".

Track listing

Charts

References

External links 
 
 

2019 albums
Albums produced by Alan Moulder
Circa Waves albums
PIAS Recordings albums